Ali-zu is an assimilated Siraya deity that is worshiped by former plains people in southern Taiwan. This god of fertility has been incorporated into the Han pantheon in some places of Taiwan.

References

Taiwanese deities
Fertility gods
Formosan mythology